Michael Christopher Stilson (born 4 July 1987) is a former Norwegian footballer.

Stilson was born in Trondheim.

Career
Stilson made his debut for Mjøndalen in 2015. After not playing many games for Mjøndalen in 2015 he was loaned out to his former club Ranheim for the rest of the season.

Career statistics

References

1987 births
Living people
Footballers from Trondheim
Norwegian footballers
Association football midfielders
Ranheim Fotball players
Mjøndalen IF players
Eliteserien players
Norwegian First Division players